Satyajit Das Rupu, is a retired Bangladeshi footballer who played as a midfielder for Bangladesh national team. He is currently the Team Manager for Abahani Limited Dhaka as well as the Bangladesh. Rupu has been the Team Manager for Abahani since 2004.

References

Living people
Year of birth missing (living people)
Bangladeshi footballers
Bangladesh international footballers
Abahani Limited (Dhaka) players
Muktijoddha Sangsad KC players
Mohammedan SC (Dhaka) players
Association football midfielders
Bangladeshi Hindus
Asian Games competitors for Bangladesh
Footballers at the 1986 Asian Games
Recipients of the Bangladesh National Sports Award